Friedrich Lienhard (4 October 1865 – 30 April 1929) was a German writer and nationalist ideologue.

Life 
Born in Rothbach near Haguenau in Alsace, Lienhard became the eldest son of the village schoolmaster Friedrich Lienhard. His mother Elisabeth ( Gutbub) died in 1877. In addition to his brother Albert, who was one year younger and later became a pastor, Lienhard had five half-brothers and sisters from his father's second marriage. From 1874 to 1886, he attended the grammar schools in Bouxwiller and Schillersdorf. From 1884, Lienhard studied Protestant theology in the University of Strasbourg. He broke off this study after four semesters to study literature and history at the Humboldt University of Berlin. After three semesters he also broke off his second degree course.

He then turned to writing. As an independent writer, he earned his living as a tutor in Lichterfelde near Berlin. From April 1893 until October 1894, he was chief editor of the anti-Semitic monthly Das zwanzigste Jahrhundert. Blätter für deutsche Art und Wohlfahrt.

In 1900, together with Adolf Bartels, he became editor of the magazine Deutsche Heimat, a medium for "literature and folklore", for a few months. It was an ideological platform for the protagonists of the folk-nationalist Heimatkunst movement. Bartels and Lienhard formed the centre of this movement, their common ideological references were the writings of Paul Lagarde and August Julius Langbehn. Lienhard rejected the common biological and ethnic racial categories and developed his own racial theory. He hoped to achieve "imperial inspiration" through a close connection between Christianity and Germanity. The "solution of the Jewish question" and the prevention of "left-wing mob rule", which seemed urgent to him as well, he saw in the assumption of "leadership" by a "noble race of great souls" with the "qualities of goodness, warmth and love". This by no means excluded anti-Semitism. For example, this is what the völkisch oriented "Weihespiel" Ahasver on the Rhine stands for. Trauerspiel aus der Gegenwart (1914). As an Alsatian, he was one of those German-speaking authors "who excelled in claiming the respective region as 'German' in their works." (Kay Dohnke). Finalely, the literary scholar Andreas Schumann concludes that the historical value references in Lienhard's work combine "Germanic, antique and Christian elements into a German-national model" which was "racially charged" and claimed a "German cultural hegemony" in Europe. Lienhard's German studies can be classified as "war German studies". Lienhard was directly involved in war propaganda through various publications, such as 

 the publication of the paper Schicksale einer Verschpeppten in Frankreich. Told by her herself and presented to the Kaiser. Together with Paul Kannengießer, a Francophobe secondary school teacher from Strasbourg, author of the book Leidensfahrten verschleppter Elsaß-Lothringer (1916).
 or by the mass brochure World War and Alsace-Lorraine (1916: 111. to 125. thousand), published in the series Schützengraben-Bücher für das deutsche Volk.
Lienhard undertook extensive travels throughout Europe, including Switzerland, Italy, Spain, Scotland and Scandinavia.

In 1908, he retired to the Thuringia Forest. At 50, he married his childhood friend, the former deaconess, in Strasbourg Marie Elisabeth Zentz. In order to be able to better spread his theories, he moved to Weimar, the seat of the Goethe-Gesellschaft, in 1916. There, he was soon appointed to the board of directors, but could not realise his plan to transform the society into an academy. In 1918, he was admitted to the "Akademie Gemeinnützige Wissenschaften zu Erfurt". From 1920 to 1928, he was editor of the formerly Protestant conservative, now völkisch cultural journal Der Türmer. Lienhard died in Eisenach in 1929 at the age of 63: Honorary citizen of the city of Weimar. Weimar 2011.</ref> and was buried at the local New Cemetery/Central Cemetery in a grave of honour of the city. At that time, he was almost forgotten. However, in view of his affinity to National Socialism, he was "like many conservatives ... honoured again after 1933"

Resonance in National Socialism 
Lienhard belongs to the forefront of National Socialism, as he represented folk-nationalistic views, but with his own character. Among other things, he wanted to combine Christianity with German nationality. As he died in 1929 at the age of 63, he was therefore not a National Socialist in the sense of the Third Reich. The "Führer" had not yet appeared, the victory of this movement, later called "takeover", had not yet been achieved. If he was brought to public attention with a piece of his Wartburg trilogy on the occasion of Martin Luther's 450th birthday in 1933, in Lübeck at least, it was because he had succeeded in sensitively honouring an outstanding German. The theatre performed the third part Luther at Wartburg Castle (1906) on 1 November 1933. This event was called a "festival". The festival speaker was the main pastor at the cathedral, representative of the German Christians, Dr.  (1891-1947), who was already appointed regional bishop of Brunswick on 1 May 1934. Contrary to expectations, however, this play proves to be more of a religious intimate play, as it shows Luther, the Bible translator, isolated and struggling in (actual) protective custody, trying to make sure that the - for him distant - events in Wittenberg do not slip his mind (iconoclasts, enthusiasts). In this situation, there could be no great action for him. Accordingly, the Lübeck media were keen to reinterpret this work: They spoke of German revolutions and the will to live of great personalities. A good example of how the National Socialists took advantage of people, works and thoughts of others, tore them out of their context and bent them for a certain situation.

Today's reception 
A reception of Lienhard's works can hardly be established today. One exception is his admittance by the particularist Alsatian "Heimatbund" ("... mìr [dian] àlli Àktiona vun in dia Rìchtung vum elsassischa Partikularismus gehn, unterstetza ..."), to which the "Neues Elsaß-Lothringen-Verlag" is closely associated, and by the fraternal milieu.

Nominations and awards 
 Dr. phil. h. c. (Straßburg 1915)
 Dr. theol. h. c. (Münster)
 Professorship (by Thuringian state government)
 Honorary citizen of Weimar (1925)
 Honorary citizen of the University of Jena (1925)
 Honorary Senator of the German Writers' Association
 Honorary member of the German Shakespeare Society

Publications

Further reading 
 Ernst Barthel: Friedrich Lienhard. Die Künstlerseele aus dem deutschen Elsaß. Alsatia, Colmar 1941
 Paul Bülow: Das Kunstwerk Richard Wagners in der Auffassung Friedrich Lienhards. Greiner und Pfeiffer, Stuttgart 1920
 Hildegard Chatellier, Friedrich Lienhard, in Uwe Puschner/Walter Schmitz/Justus H. Ulbricht (ed.), Handbuch zur "Völkischen Bewegung" 1871–1918, Munich among others. 1996, 
 Marc Chaudeur: Redecouvrir Friedrich Lienhard (1865–1929). "Land un Sprooch. Les Cahiers du bilinguisme". Nr. 194 (June 2015), 
 Jürgen Dettmann: Friedrich Lienhard (1865–1929). Ein elsässischer Dichter und das geistige Deutschland. "Der Westen", Gesellschaft der Freunde und ´Förderer der Erwin von Steinbach-Stiftung, Beiheft 16. Stuttgart 2008. 
 Michael Ertz: Friedrich Lienhard und René Schickele. Elsässische Literaten zwischen Deutschland und Frankreich. Olms, Hildesheim 1990. (Auslandsdeutsche Literatur der Gegenwart, 23) 
 Paul Gaude: Das Odysseusthema in der neueren deutschen Literatur, besonders bei Hauptmann und Lienhard. Univ. Diss. Greifswald 1916
 Elke Kimmel: Lienhard, Friedrich. In Wolfgang Benz (ed.): . Vol. 2/2: Personen L–Z. Walter de Gruyter Saur, Berlin 2009, 
 Karl König: Friedrich Lienhards Weg vom Grenzland zum Hochland. Beyer, Langensalza 1929. (Friedrich Mann's pädagogisches Magazin, 1259)
 Helmut Langenbucher: Friedrich Lienhard und sein Anteil am Kampf um die deutsche Erneuerung. Rauhes Haus, Hamburg 1935
 Friedrich Lienhard und wir. Dem deutschen Dichter Friedrich Lienhard zum 50. Geburtstage, Wilhelm Edward Gierke editor. Greiner und Pfeiffer, Stuttgart 1915
 Thomas Neumann: … der die idealen Triebe Ihrer Vorschläge vollauf zu würdigen weiß. Friedrich Lienhard und die Goethe-Gesellschaft, in Jürgen John, Weimar 1930. Politik und Kultur im Vorfeld der NS-Diktatur. 1998, 
 Thomas Neumann: Lienhard, Friedrich. In Christoph König (ed.), in collaboration with Birgit Wägenbaur among others: Internationales Germanistenlexikon 1800–1950. Vol. 2: H–Q. Walter De Gruyter, Berlin/New York 2003,  (neueste Bio-Bibliographische Information zu FL).
 Uwe Puschner, Antisemitism and German Voelkish Ideology, in Hubert Cancik/Uwe Puschner, Antisemitismus, Paganismus, Völkische Religion, Munich 2004, 
 Justus Strackwitz: Friedrich Lienhard (1865–1929): "Oberlin". Buchbesprechung in Die Rundschau. Zeitschrift für Freunde der Kultur und Geschichte (Erfurt) 34 (4/2009), 
 Justus Strackwitz: Friedrich Lienhard (1865–1929): "Westmark". Buchbesprechung in Die Rundschau. Zeitschrift für Freunde der Kultur und Geschichte (Erfurt) 38 (4/2010), 
 
 Sascha Grosser (ed.): Klassiker neu aufgelegt: Friedrich Lienhard - Der Dorfschmied, Lyrikmanufaktur, Olfen, 2019,

References

External links 

 Wikisource Friedrich Lienhard
 
 
 
 Bild von Lienhard

19th-century German writers
19th-century German male writers
20th-century German writers
German opinion journalists
German literary critics
German publishers (people)
1865 births
1929 deaths
People from Haguenau